Mercurino Arborio, marchese di Gattinara (10 June 1465 – 5 June 1530), was an Italian statesman and jurist best known as the chancellor of the Holy Roman Emperor Charles V. He was made cardinal of the Roman Catholic Church for San Giovanni a Porta Latina in 1529.

Biography
He was born in Gattinara, near Vercelli, modern Piedmont. Mercurino Gattinara initially served as the legal advisor to Margaret of Austria in Savoy.  She considered him as chief amongst her various counsellors.

Mercurino Gattinara is however mostly famous for having served as Emperor Charles V's “Grand Chancellor of all the realms and kingdoms of the king.”  Upon the death of Charles' counsellor Chièvres, Gattinara would become the king's most influential advisor.  He was a Roman Catholic, humanist, Erasmian, jurist and scholar—at the same time idealist in his goals, and realist in his tactics.  He was a scholar of jurisprudence, the classic theory of the state, and the Christian doctrine of duty.  Gattinara would guide Charles away from both his roots in dynastic Burgundy, and from the prevailing secular political theory of Spain at the time, toward a Christian humanist conception of Empire.  His ideas of the primacy of the Empire in Europe were in direct contradiction with the growing trend toward the theory of the nation state.

In his capacity as Chancellor, he urged Charles V to create a dynastic empire with the object of establishing global rule ("Dominium Mundi").  Gattinara in his policy advice and personal writings argued for Christian imperialism, based on a united Christendom, which would then combat or convert the Protestants, the Turks, and the infidels of the New World. His theory attempted to balance the solidarity of Christian nations, with the requirements of conquest for the establishment of one world empire.

Gattinara was instrumental in shifting Charles V's policy vision from that of a regional dynastic monarch to an empire-builder.  Doubtless due in large part to Gattinara's counsel, the Habsburg Empire would reach its territorial height under Charles V, although it would begin to show signs of decay at the end of his reign, most importantly with the independence granted to the economically thriving but tax-averse Low Countries.

Goals
After Charles's election to the throne, Gattinara wrote to him:

In the conclusion to this letter, Gattinara reiterated his belief that the true purpose of monarchy was to unite all people in the service of God.

During a review for the purpose of administrative reform, Gattinara advised Charles, in a section of the report entitled “Reverence toward God” on issues such as: whether Moors and Infidels should be tolerated in his lands; whether the inhabitants of the West Indian islands and the mainland were to be converted to Christianity; and whether the Inquisition should be reformed.

Another goal espoused by Gattinara was to unite Christendom against the Turk, as well as against the Lutheran heresy.  There was little practical basis for achieving such an understanding between the European powers, however.

Gattinara's own summation of his views included the final goal of laying the foundations for a policy that was truly imperial, leading to a general war on the infidel and heretic.  His first objective was the Emperor's voyage to Italy as soon as the fleet was ready.  Gattinara concealed the reason for expanding the fleet by reference to the troubles in Mexico.

At every fresh opportunity, Gattinara was for “taking time by the forelock” and establishing the power of Charles V in Italy without more delay.  This would function as a permanent guarantee of peace, not only on the peninsula but in all Europe.  Gattinara's views were rooted in Dante, despite having to face many practical setbacks.  He faced deep-seated opposition to the imperial council, and Gattinara began to acknowledge that many were against his plan.  Many Spaniards suspected Gattinara of having interests in Italy (as he was originally from Piedmont), as so his motives were questioned, and he was even threatened.

Gattinara held Dante's dream of universal monarchy as the ultimate goal of Charles V's rule, united both Christendom and eventually the world.  These ideas were in line with some of Charles's other advisors.  Imperial ambassador at Henry VIII’s court, M. Louis de Praet, wrote to Charles: 

Charles’s secretary, Alfonso de Valdés, a humanist and Erasmian like Gattinara, would write to Charles after the victory of Pavia (a defeat for the French, including the capture of their king François I):

The Spanish missionary spirit is here wedded with Dante’s theocratic ideal and expresses the high expectations of the humanist Italians and Spaniards surrounding Charles.  The Emperor was seen as the reviver of the Roman universal Monarchy who could put an end to the feudal and dynastic conflicts, and establish a democratic imperium.  Charles' more limited goals of ordering his empire within a Respublica Christiana (a united Europe) was disappointing to his advisors seeking world-dominion, especially so to Gattinara, the aspirant to “world-empire.”

Policies
Just as Gattinara is noted for his universalist idealism, he is also recognized as adept in the practice of realpolitik.

Taking over from Charles V's advisor Carlos de Chièvres, Gattinara shifted the policy outlook of his king.  Chièvres had advocated protecting the Netherlands through understandings with France and England, attempting to avoid war with France especially.  Gattinara aimed at broadening Charles from a narrow Burgundian/Spanish outlook toward a wide imperial vision.  At the center of his imperial policy was Italy: Milan was the vital link between the Habsburg holdings of Spain/Franche-Comté and Tyrol.  By the last months of 1521, Gattinara had succeeded in shifting the war with France from Navarre to Italy.  His imperial strategy had two conditions for success: domination of Italy, and alliance with Rome.

Gattinara was the source of Charles's shift in policy toward Italy—no other cabinet member pushed for these policies.  A year previous to Gattinara's appointment, the English ambassador Tunstal had remarked on Gattinara's preoccupation with Italy.  Gattinara had drawn up advance drafts of war plans against Italy, in which he stresses that since God called Charles to be the first prince of Christendom it was fitting that he turns his attention to Italy, saying that anyone who counselled Charles against pursuing Italy in lieu of interest elsewhere was prescribing the king's ruin, shame and blame.  Gattinara emphasized the low cost of an Italian campaign, and the necessary troop mobilization necessary for overwhelming force.

In deciding whether or not to advise Charles V to go to war against France in northern Italy, Gattinara constructed an allegory posing the seven deadly sins against the ten commandments—seven causes for avoiding war, and ten arguments in favour.  Against, the reasons were all quite practical: an attack would place a great stake on a single strategy with an uncertain method of solution; there was not enough money in the treasury; negotiations with other Italian states were uncertain; the Swiss might ally themselves with France, and the area would soon be fraught with danger from the impending winter.  However, Gattinara argued that the war was justified by Charles V's bond to honour the Pope, whom he needed as an ally.  Clearly, God was on Charles's side, and to let France escape a fight would be to tempt fate—he would not have the chance, as resources would not be mobilized so easily next time.  Additionally, with the army mobilized, it would not look good to call it off at the eleventh hour.  Gattinara saw to it that his ten commandments won out over the seven deadly sins.

Gattinara was not an idealist when it came to policy.  The Treaty of Madrid was forced upon Francis I of France by Charles after Francis was captured.  The treaty spoke in romantic hyperbole and ended with an oath for both rulers to undertake a crusade together.  While François signed the treaty under duress, Gattinara refused to affix the imperial seal to the document, because of his sense of realpolitik.  François would subsequently break the terms of the treaty, which had been to renounce claims in Italy, surrender Burgundy, and abandon suzerainty over Flanders and Artois.

See also 
 Nicolas Perrenot de Granvelle

References

Alvarez, Manuel Fernandez.  Charles V: Elected emperor and hereditary ruler.  Thames and Hudson, London: 1975.
Boone, Rebecca Ard. Mercurino di Gattinara and the Creation of the Spanish Empire. Pickering and Chatto, London: 2014.
Brandi, Karl. trans. C.V. Wedgwood.  The Emperor Charles V: The Growth and Destiny of a Man and of a World-Empire.  Humanities Press, Atlantic Highlands, NJ: 1980.
Habsburg, Otto von. trans. Michael Ross.  Charles V.  Praeger Publishers, Washington: 1970.
Headley, John M. The emperor and his chancellor: a study of the imperial chancellery under Gattinara. New York: Cambridge University Press, 1983.
Schwarzenfeld. Gertrude von.  Charles V: Father of Europe.  Hollis & Carter, London: 1957.
Headley, John, The emperor and his chancellor: a study of the imperial chancellery under Gattinara, New York: Cambridge University Press, 1983.
Rivero Rodríguez, Manuel, Gattinara: Carlos V y el sueño del Imperio, Madrid: Sílex, 2005.
Rivero Rodríguez, Manuel, «Memoria, escritura y Estado: la autobiografía de Mercurino Arborio di Gattinara, Gran canciller de Carlos V», en Martínez Millán, José (coord.), Carlos V y la quiebra del humanismo político en Europa (1530-1558), Madrid: Sociedad Estatal para la Conmemoración de los Centenarios de Felipe II y Carlos V, volumen 1, 2000, págs. 199-224.
Rivero Rodríguez, Manuel, La Corona de Aragón, metáfora de la Monarquía de Carlos V: Gattinara y sus ideas sobre el gobierno (1519-1520), en García García, Bernardo José (coord.), El Imperio de Carlos V: procesos de agregación y conflictos, Madrid: Fundación Carlos de Amberes, 2000, págs. 97-110.
Boone, Rebecca, Mercurino di Gattinara and the creation of the Spanish Empire, London, Vermont: Pickering & Chatto, 2014.
Boone, Rebecca, «Empire and Medieval Simulachrum. A political project of Mercurino Arborio di Gattinara, Gran Chancellor of Charles V», en Sixteenth Century Journal, 4 (2011), págs. 1027-1049.

1465 births
1530 deaths
People from Gattinara
16th-century people of the Holy Roman Empire
16th-century Italian politicians
16th-century Italian cardinals
Italian Renaissance humanists
Chancellors (government)